Francesco Maria Cardelli (born 1 May 1964) is a Sammarinese alpine skier. He competed at the 1984 Winter Olympics and the 1988 Winter Olympics.

References

External links
 

1964 births
Living people
Sammarinese male alpine skiers
Olympic alpine skiers of San Marino
Alpine skiers at the 1984 Winter Olympics
Alpine skiers at the 1988 Winter Olympics
Place of birth missing (living people)